Chucky Bartolo (born Andrew Bartolo; 5 July 1993) is a Maltese stand-up comedian and drag queen. His career breakthrough came as a writer and journalist for Lovin Malta after years of garnering a small following on YouTube as a vlogger. Bartolo is openly gay and uses his platform to speak out against hate speech and fight for reclamation of derogatory slurs.

Since November 2018 he has written and starred in three stand-up specials, and was the closing speaker of TEDx University of Malta's 2019 edition, 'Quirks'. In 2018 Bartolo also starred as the Dame in Malta's National Theatre (Teatru Malta)'s first pantomime and returned to the role in 2019 and 2020. To comply with COVID-19 safety regulations, the pantomime was moved to air on select national radio stations and is the only one taking place on the island in 2020.

References 

1993 births
Living people
Gay comedians
LGBT YouTubers
Gay actors
Maltese male stage actors
Maltese journalists
Male journalists
Maltese comedians
Drag queens
Maltese LGBT people
20th-century LGBT people
21st-century LGBT people